Rohtas Nagar Assembly constituency is one of the seventy Delhi assembly constituencies of Delhi in northern India.
Rohtas Nagar assembly constituency is a part of North East Delhi (Lok Sabha constituency).

Members of Legislative Assembly

Election results

2020

2015

2013

2009 By Election results

2008

2003

1998

1993

References

Assembly constituencies of Delhi
Delhi Legislative Assembly